Charity schools, sometimes called blue coat schools, or simply the Blue School, were significant in the history of education in England. They were built and maintained in various parishes by the voluntary contributions of the inhabitants to teach poor children to read and write, and for other necessary parts of education. They were usually maintained by religious organisations, which provided clothing and education to students freely or at little charge. In most charity schools, children were put out to trades, services, etc., by the same charitable foundation. Some schools were more ambitious than this and sent a few pupils on to university.

Charity schools began in London, and spread throughout most of the urban areas in England and Wales. By 1710, the statistics for charity schools in and around London were as follows: number of schools, 88; boys taught, 2,181; girls, 1,221; boys put out to apprentices, 967; girls, 407. By the 19th century, English elementary schools were predominantly charity schools.

Blue coat schools in order of foundation

See also
 Charity Children Choirs
 Bluecoat school
 Ragged school
 History of education in England
 Society for Promoting Christian Knowledge

References

Christ's Hospital
Education in England
Education in the United Kingdom
School types
Leeds Blue Plaques